The Chestatee Regional Library System (CRLS) is a system of four public libraries serving the counties of Dawson County, and Lumpkin County, Georgia, United States.

The name Chestatee is from the Cherokee word meaning "place of the lights." This refers to the practice of hunting deer at night.

CRLS is a member of PINES, a program of the Georgia Public Library Service that covers 53 library systems in 143 counties of Georgia. Any resident in a PINES supported library system has access to over 10.6 million books in the system's circulation. The library is also serviced by GALILEO, a program of the University System of Georgia which stands for "GeorgiA LIbrary LEarning Online". This program offers residents in supported libraries access to over 100 databases indexing thousands of periodicals and scholarly journals. It also boasts over 10,000 journal titles in full text.

History
The Chestatee Regional Library System was first founded in 1953 as a two-county regional library system serving the communities of Hall and Lumpkin Counties. In 1994, in an effort to mutually expand the resources of their libraries, Dawson County joined with Hall and Lumpkin to make the library system a tri-county consortium. However, shortly thereafter in 1997, Hall County withdrew from the system and began their own self-sufficient library system, the Hall County Library System made up of its own five branches.

Branches

Library systems in neighboring counties
Mountain Regional Library System to the north
Northeast Georgia Regional Library System to the east
Hall County Library System to the south east
Forsyth County Public Library to the south
Sequoyah Regional Library System to the west

References

External links
PINES catalog

County library systems in Georgia (U.S. state)
Public libraries in Georgia (U.S. state)